"Wristband" is a song by American singer-songwriter Paul Simon. It was the first single from his album Stranger to Stranger (2016), released on Concord Records.

Background and composition
Simon collaborates with the Italian electronic dance music artist Clap! Clap! on "Wristband". Simon was introduced to him in 2015 by his son, Adrian, who was a fan of his work. "Wristband" creates a narrative around a rock musician unable to gain entry into his own concert because he lacks the wristband required. The singer tries to persuade the security guard to let him in, and cannot even gain admittance to the backstage without the right pass. The song eventually transitions into a larger symbol of outrage of underprivileged people "whose anger is a shorthand / For you'll never get a wristband." Peter Ames Carlin writes, "It is an archetypal Paul Simon move: bridging the personal and the social, the silly with the serious, the frivolous and the absolutely essential." "It's not a true story," said Simon. "But I know plenty of people with this story and there have been times where I've been stopped backstage and asked to see a pass."

According to the sheet music published at Musicnotes.com by Sony/ATV Music Publishing, the song is composed in the key of E♭ major with Paul Simon's vocal range spanning from Eb4 to Eb5.

Release and reception
Simon premiered the song on the National Public Radio series Live from Here with Chris Thile on February 6, 2016. "Wristband", as the first single from Stranger to Stranger, was released online on April 7, 2016. The song peaked at #14 on the Adult Alternative Songs chart on May 21. Simon performed the song on Austin City Limits in September, which National Public Radio praised as a "playfully infectious version of the song." Stereogum called the song "a rhythmic groove that finds Simon spinning a tale of getting locked out of a venue while taking a smoke break into a meditation on the perpetuation of social inequality."

Personnel
Paul Simon – lead and backing vocals
Keith Montie – backing vocals
Carlos Henrique – bass
Clap! Clap! – electronic drums, synthesizer, samples
Jamey Haddad – handclaps, percussion
Nino de los Reyes – handclaps, percussion
Oscar de los Reyes – handclaps, percussion
Sergio Martínez – handclaps, percussion
Andy Snitzer – saxophone, backing vocals
C.J. Camerieri – trumpet

References

Bibliography

External links
"Wristband" The Paul Simon Official Site
Songfacts page

2016 songs
Songs written by Paul Simon
Paul Simon songs
Song recordings produced by Roy Halee